Hellinsia illutus is a moth of the family Pterophoridae. It is known from South Africa.

References

Endemic moths of South Africa
illutus
Moths of Africa
Insects of South Africa
Moths described in 1917